Ingeborgrud is a village in Nes municipality, Norway. It is a part of the urban area Skogrand, which is located north of Oppakermoen and west of Skarnes. Its population is 333.

References

Villages in Akershus
Nes, Akershus